This uniform polyhedron compound is a composition of two truncated tetrahedra, formed by truncating each of the tetrahedra in the stellated octahedron.

The vertex arrangement is the same as a convex, but nonuniform rhombicuboctahedron having 12 rectangular faces.

References 
.

Polyhedral compounds